Arnold Rikli (13 February 1823 – 30 April 1906) was a Swiss naturopath. Rikli was notable for his natural healing regimens and for his role in making the town of Bled, Slovenia into a health tourism destination in the latter part of the 19th century. Rikli was also a supporter of the so-called Lebensreform (life reform) social movement.

History
Rikli was born into a wealthy Swiss family as one of three sons. His father was involved with politics and had his own factory. His father's wish was that his sons would inherit his knowledge and ambitions; therefore, he sent Rikli and his brother Karl to the village of Seebach near Spittal, Austria. There, they built a new factory for leather dyeing. Rikli became very unwell with diarrhea, and he blamed his illness on exposure to chemicals. For purposes of rest and recuperation, he went to Bled in Slovenia in 1852 for the first time. He thrived there. After two years, he developed centres for helio-hydroscopic treatment. He abandoned the family business and started his own healing method in Bled. Rikli proposed various therapies, most of which were based on exposing the body to water, air, and sun. Called sun tanning, it was preferable for these therapies to be done while naked. His healing was founded on swimming in cold water, sun tanning, and walking. His famous quote was: "Water is good, air is better and most of all the sunlight". Guests resided in special houses, washed in tubs, and walked naked in the surrounding area (especially on the neighbouring hill called Straža, which later featured ski, walking, trim, and skeleton areas). Rikli was not very popular among the people in his local area; this may have followed from public nakedness in his park, the fact that he never learned the Slovenian language (despite living there for 52 years), and that he never accepted local customs. Signs and guides in his park were written in German. Locals nicknamed Rikli as "Švajcar" (Swiss guy) because of his nationality and "sun doctor" because he promoted sun tanning.

Rikli created baths, walking paths, hiking paths and housing in Bled. In the year 1895, he built a wooden house and baths in Swiss style and a hospital with his own examination office. Because the word spread across Europe about Rikli's activities, a larger swimming area was constructed in 1899. Besides the people who were looking for healing, Bled started to attract people who wanted to spend their holidays in a healthy and clean environment. The number of visitors started to rise in 1870, after a railway station was built in Lesce. In 1903, Bled was awarded with a gold medal at an international fair of healing places in Vienna. In 1906, Bled was classified among the best tourist destinations in Austro-Hungarian Empire. The healing place was operating until the First World War, but was later abandoned. Rikli received a statue at his 50th healing anniversary. Every year, starting with July, Bled organizes Rikli's sport days and hiking on Rikli's paths. At that time, hikers walk, run and climb on the hills above Bled. Rikli's Villa is under the cultural guidance. As of 2010, the owner of the building is Nicholas Oman.

Arnold Rikli Award
Since 2016, the Jörg Wolff Foundation in Germany, has awarded annually the Arnold Rikli Prize, endowed with 10,000 euros, for photobiological research in relation to the human organism; the award is under the patronage of the European Society for Photobiology (ESP).

From 1989, the Light Symposium Foundation in Atlanta (USA), awarded the Arnold Rikli Prize, until the foundations' dissolution in 2005, recognizing work that deals with the biological effects of light on humans.

Bibliography
Rikli's books discussed the theory and practical methods of healing with air, sun and steam baths. The books show a broad spectrum of natural healing places in Bled. Five of the books from the years 1872–1894 are held by the National and University Library of Slovenia. All the books are made out of wooden paper. The National and University Library of Slovenia is the only library which keeps the original books.

Rikli's books are:

 Arnold Rikli: Rikli‛s Bett - und Theildampfbäder, 3. verbesserte Auflage, 1872
 Arnold Rikli: Rikli‛s Bett - und Theildampfbäder, 4. verbesserte Auflage, 1889
 Arnold Rikli: Die Grundlehren der Naturheilkunde (first title "Allgemeine Curregeln") mit besonderer Berücksichtigung der atmosphärischen Cur, verbesserte Aufl., 1890
 Arnold Rikli: Die atmosphärische Kur oder das Lichtluftbad und das Sonnenbad und die Sonne der schärfste Diagnostiker und prognostiker, 4. verbesserte Auflage, 1894
 Arnold Rikli: Die atmosphärische Cur oder die Sonne der schärfste Diagnostiker und Prognostiker. Special Print from "Zeitschrift für Gesundheitspflege und Naturheilkunde", Berlin.

See also 
 Naturism

References 

 Robert Jütte. Geschichte der alternativen Medizin: Von der Volksmedizin zu den unkonventionellen Therapien von heute.Verlag C. H. Beck, München 1996 
 Brian English, Ruth West. Alternativna medicina: Najobsežnejši izbor naravnih načinov zdravljenja. Mladinska knjiga 1988 
 Lidija Vinkovič. Voda je dobra, zrak boljši, sonce pa najboljše; oglasna priloga FInance. četrtek, 24. junij 2004. stran 33
 The Environmental Agency of the Republic of Slovenia (Tanja Cegnar. Klimatska terapija: Klimatska zdravilišča in zdravilni učinki klime. 2003) 
 Vlasta Gjura Kaloper. Sončna svetloba je vir življenja in zdravja; članek iz revije Sladkorna.Glasilo Zveze društev diabetikov Slovenije. številka 64. April 2006. stran 13 
 Hydro therapy 
 National Library Silver Group 
 The Slovene uninon of naturists clubs
 Naturism - Oblečeni v sonce 
 Zdravstveni turizem in Arnold Rikli

External links

1823 births
1906 deaths
Naturopaths
Social nudity advocates